The 1958 Christchurch mayoral election was held to elect a successor to Robert Macfarlane who resigned as Mayor of Christchurch upon his selection as Speaker of the New Zealand House of Representatives. The polling was conducted using the standard first-past-the-post electoral method.

Background
Labour councillor George Manning was elected to replace McFarlane, opposed only by councillor William "Bill" Glue of the Citizens' Association.

A by-election for the City Council was also held upon the resignations of both Manning and Glue in order to contest the mayoralty. Councillors Mabel Howard and John Mathison also resigned their seats following their election as cabinet ministers at the formation of the Second Labour government at the November 1957 general election.

McFarlane was elected for a seat on the council, with the remaining three seats being won by the Citizens' Association. Glue was re-elected to the council with Bill MacGibbon and Peter Skellerup the other successful candidates.

Mayoralty results
The following table gives the election results:

 
 
 
 
 

Manning polled highest at 84 polling stations with Glue finishing first in remaining 25.

Council results
The following table gives the election results:

References

Mayoral elections in Christchurch
1958 elections in New Zealand
Politics of Christchurch
May 1958 events in New Zealand
1950s in Christchurch